The Mitra was a single-screen theater, situated in Bidhan Sarani, Hatibagan, Kolkata, opposite of Minar Cinema Hall. It had started operation under Birendra Nath Sarkar as "Chitra Cinema" in 1931 with the screening of Uttam Kumar-starrer Dena Paona. The theater was renamed to Mitra in 1963 when Hemonta Krishna Mitra took the possession. The theater was closed for business after 88 years.

References

Former cinemas
Cinemas in Kolkata
Cinema of Bengal